The Gilded Butterfly is a 1926 American silent drama film directed by John Griffith Wray and starring Alma Rubens, Bert Lytell, and Huntley Gordon.

Plot
As described in a film magazine review, Linda Haverhill is left penniless after the death of her father, who was esteemed but lived by his wits and was a sponger par excellence. She is advanced money by John Converse, who desires her despite her social butterfly tendencies. Attempting to maintain her place in society, she travels abroad but soon goes broke. On the way, Linda falls in love with Captain Brian Anestry of the United States Army, who arouses John's suspicions. In an attempt to obtain the insurance money, Linda burns her gowns and is arrested. Enroute to prison and while accompanied by a detective, their taxi is wrecked when it collides with a patrol wagon. The detective, fatally injured, identifies a different dead woman as his prisoner, allowing Linda to escape. John turns out not to be so villainous after all and relents, allowing Brian and Linda to be united.

Cast

Preservation
With no prints of The Gilded Butterfly located in any film archives, it is a lost film.

References

Bibliography
 Solomon, Aubrey. The Fox Film Corporation, 1915-1935: A History and Filmography. McFarland, 2011.

External links

1926 films
1926 drama films
Silent American drama films
American silent feature films
1920s English-language films
Fox Film films
Films directed by John Griffith Wray
American black-and-white films
1920s American films